The Czech and Slovak pavilion houses the national representation of the Czech Republic and Slovakia during the Venice Biennale arts festivals.

Background

Organization and building 

Architect Otakar Novotny designed the pavilion for Czechoslovakia in 1926 with strong influence from Cubism and European functionalism.

Representation by year

Art 

 1926 — Charlotte Schrötter-Radnitz
 1942 — Janko Alexy, Miloš Alexander Bazovský, Martin Benka, Ľudovít Fulla, Jan Hála, Jozef Kollar, Frantisek Kudlac, Eugen Lehotský, Gustav Mally, Peter Matejka, Lea Mrazova, Jan Mudroch, Karol Ondreička, Štefan Polkoráb, Teodor Tekel, Jaroslav Votruba, Júlia Kováciková-Horová, Vojtech Ihrisky, Jan Koniarek, Jozef Kostka, Ladislav Majerský, Fraňo Stefunko, Koloman Sokol
 1956 — Josef Lada, Adolf Zábranský, Jiří Trnka, Antonín Pelc, Cyril Bouda, Václav Karel, Kamil Lhoták, Antonín Strnadel, Vincenc Vingler, a.o.
 1964 — Vladimír Kompánek
 1966 — Jozef Kornúcik, Vladimír Kompánek
 1970 — Jozef Jankovič
 1986 — Ivan Ouhel
 1993 — František Skála, Daniel Fischer
 1995 — Jozef Jankovič
 1999 — (Curators: Petra Hanáková and Alexandra Kusá)
 2001 — Jiří Surůvka, Ilona Németh (Curator: Katarína Rusnáková)
 2005 — Stanislav Filko, Jan Mančuška, Boris Ondreička (Curator: Marek Pokorný)
 2007 — Irena Jůzová (Curator: Tomáš Vlček)
 2009 — Roman Ondak (Curator: Kathrin Rhomberg)
 2011 — Dominik Lang (Curator: Yvona Ferencová)
 2013 — Petra Feriancová, Zbyněk Baladrán (Curator: Marek Pokorný)
 2015 — Jiří David (Curator: Katarína Rusnáková)
 2017 — Jana Želibská
 2019 — Stanislav Kolíbal (Curator: Dieter Bogner)

References

Bibliography

Further reading 

 
 
 

National pavilions
Czech contemporary art
Slovak art